FlySafair is an international low-cost airline based in Johannesburg, South Africa. It is a wholly owned subsidiary of Safair. The company slogan is For The Love Of Flying.

History
The airline was established in August 2013 and was granted approval by the South African Air Service Licensing Council to launch operations with ten daily services between Johannesburg's OR Tambo International Airport and Cape Town International Airport. The airline had plans to begin operations in October 2013. However, on 8 October 2013, the High Court of South Africa granted an interim court order preventing the airline from starting operations, following an application by rival carriers, on the basis that it did not meet the legal requirement of 75% local ownership. Substantial restructuring of ownership took place and FlySafair's inaugural flight eventually took place on 16 October 2014.

In 2017, the airline announced a partnership with the South African Rugby Union (SARU), making it the official domestic carrier for the Springboks and SA Rugby. The deal was extended for four years in February 2020.

in October 2022, the airline went through a rebrand, with redesigns to their logo and new livery. The International Air Services Council of South Africa also approved 11 new international routes.

Destinations
FlySafair serves the following 19 destinations :

Interline agreements
FlySafair interlines with the following airlines:
 Air France
 KLM
 Qatar Airways
 Emirates
 Kenya Airways
 Ethiopian Airlines
 Proflight Zambia

Fleet

As of February 2023, the FlySafair fleet consists of the following aircraft:

Services

In-Flight Service
FlySafair offers food and drinks as a buy-on-board programme. FlySafair also offers a monthly magazine on board named In Flight. It was also the first airline in South Africa to offer card payments aboard their flights. On their international routes they offer a pre-packed meal at no charge, with other food and drink options for sale. For hygienic reasons, the In Flight magazine is currently only in digital format.

FlySafair Holidays
FlySafair launched their Holidays programme in May 2021, partnering with local company Tripco to combine flights and accommodation.

Accidents and Incidents 

 On 12 November 2022, a parked FlySafair Boeing 737-8BG (ZS-SJH) collided with a South African Airways Airbus A320 (ZS-SZJ) being towed at O. R. Tambo International Airport. No passengers were onboard either aircraft at the time. The 737’s empennage section and A320's wingtip were damaged. Both aircraft were returned to service shortly after the incident.

See also
 List of airlines of South Africa

References

External links

 

Airlines established in 2013
South African companies established in 2013
Airlines of South Africa
Low-cost carriers
Companies based in Johannesburg